Dora May Broadbent,  (7 February 1923 – 23 July 2014), known as Dora Bryan, was a British actress of stage, film and television.

Early life
Bryan was born in Southport, Lancashire. Her father was a salesman and she attended Hathershaw County Primary School in Oldham, Lancashire. Her career began in pantomime before the Second World War, during which she joined ENSA in Italy to entertain British troops.

Career

Stage
Bryan made her stage debut as a child in a pantomime in Manchester, and encouraged by her mother, joined the Oldham Repertory while still a teenager. After spending six years honing her craft there, she moved to London to develop her stage career, becoming a regular performer in the West End. Cast in a production of Noël Coward's Private Lives, the actress was encouraged to adopt a stage name by Coward himself. She opted for Dora Bryant, which she often said was inspired by a box of Bryant and May matches that were lying on the table, but a typographical error left off the last letter on the theatre credits and she became Dora Bryan.

In 1955, Bryan received theatrical recognition when, after the first night of a production of A.P. Herbert's The Water Gypsies, the billing outside was changed to "Dora Bryan in A.P. Herbert's The Water Gipsies. It was Bryan's first venture into West End musical comedy, in which she played Lily Bell, and was a personal triumph. The show's hit songs, sung by Bryan, included "Why Did You Call Me Lily?", "You Never Know with Men", and "It Would Cramp My Style".

Throughout her career, she continued to perform on the stage, often appearing in musicals such as Gentleman Prefer Blondes (1962) and Hello, Dolly! (1966–1968). She also headlined a number of stage revues such as The Dora Bryan Show (1966), "My Name Is Dora" (1967) and An Evening with Dora Bryan and Friends (1968). She made her Broadway debut as Mrs. Pierce in Pygmalion (1987), starring Peter O'Toole and Amanda Plummer. Other credits include her first Shakespearean role, Mistress Quickly in The Merry Wives of Windsor (1984), Mrs. Hardcastle in She Stoops to Conquer (1985) and Carlotta Campion (singing "I'm Still Here") in the 1987 London production of the Stephen Sondheim-James Goldman musical Follies. In 1992, she toured the country including appearing at the Theatre Royal, Brighton, her home town, and starred in London's West End at the Vaudeville Theatre in Kander and Ebb's 70 Girls 70 to great acclaim. She appeared with Trevor Peacock in the National Theatre's 1994 revival of Harold Pinter's The Birthday Party.

Screen roles and other work
Instantly recognisable from her voice, which became a trademark of her performances, she followed many of her theatre contemporaries into film acting, generally playing supporting roles. She often played women of easy virtue—for example in The Fallen Idol (1948), one of her early films, and Ealing's The Blue Lamp (1950). She appeared in similarly stereotypical female roles in other films, for example Gift Horse (1952), The Cockleshell Heroes (1955), The Green Man (1956) and Carry On Sergeant (1958).

She appeared in cameo on radio comedy series of which included Much-Binding-in-the-Marsh (1951), Hancock's Half Hour an episode commonly known as "Cinderella Hancock" (1955). British Pathe filmed Bryan in 1957 in 'Home on Wheels', featuring her and friends in her personal caravan. She appeared  in the film A Taste of Honey (1961), which won four BAFTA awards, including Best Actress for Bryan and Best British Film. In 1963, she recorded the Christmas song "All I Want for Christmas Is a Beatle", which reached no. 20 on the UK charts. She played the Headmistress in The Great St Trinian's Train Robbery (1966), and she starred in According to Dora (1968–1969), her own television series for the BBC.

Bryan appeared in the UK-Argentine thriller Apartment Zero (1988). The film was directed by Martin Donovan and starred Hart Bochner and Colin Firth. Bryan plays the role of one of two eccentric characters (the other was played by Liz Smith) described by The Washington Post as two "tea-and-crumpet gargoyle-featured spinsters who snoop the corridors". It featured in the 1988 Sundance Film Festival. She appeared in two episodes of series one of the BBC sitcom On The Up in 1990 as Mrs Carpenter (the mother of main character Tony, played by Dennis Waterman), but left soon after to be replaced by actress Pauline Letts for series two and three. Around this time, she joked with Terry Wogan and Michael Barrymore on their TV shows that she was aged not 70 but "sixty-several" and could still kick her leg higher than her head.

In 1999, she made an appearance in the Victoria Wood sitcom dinnerladies. In 2000, she joined the cast of the long-running BBC comedy series Last of the Summer Wine as Aunt Ros Utterthwaite, and in 2001 she was a guest star on Absolutely Fabulous as June Whitfield's on-screen friend Dolly (originally called Milly). She received a BAFTA nomination in 2002 for this role.

A few years later in 2005 her role in Last of the Summer Wine came to an end. At about the same time, she stopped making films. Her last screen appearance was in the short film Gone to the Dogs (2006) with Antony Booth. In 2006, she intended to appear both in the comedy Rock-a-Hula Rest Home at a pub theatre in Brighton and in the comedy There's No Place Like a Home, but she had to withdraw because of her inability to memorise her lines.

Awards and testimonials
Her autobiography According to Dora was published in 1987. In 1996, she was awarded the OBE in recognition of her services to acting and the same year she was awarded a Laurence Olivier Award for her role in the West End production of the Harold Pinter play The Birthday Party. She was the subject of This Is Your Life on two occasions, in April 1962 when she was surprised by Eamonn Andrews at her home in Brighton, and in January 1989 when Michael Aspel surprised her on the stage of the Opera House at the curtain call of Hello, Dolly!. An exhibition about Bryan opened on 13 September 2013 at Rottingdean Museum.

Personal life
Dora was married for 54 years to former Lancashire and Cumberland cricketer Bill Lawton until his death in August 2008. The couple met in Oldham during World War II and were married at Werneth St Thomas, Oldham in 1954. During her husband's final years, she reduced her public commitments to enable herself to look after him, and she suffered with her health, including a serious operation for a hernia. 

Bryan once owned Clarges Hotel at 115–119 Marine Parade on Brighton's seafront, which was used as an exterior location in the films Carry On Girls and Carry On at Your Convenience. She and her husband lived there for more than 40 years but were forced to sell the bulk of the building because of bankruptcy, but they retained a flat with a sea view on the first floor for many years. Still maintaining its original structure, the rooms of the hotel have been reconverted into flats. By 2013, she was a wheelchair user and resided in a nursing home in Hove in frail health.

On 31 May 2009, Dora – A Gala Charity Show was held at Her Majesty's Theatre in London to raise funds for two charities nominated by Bryan: the Variety Club Children's Charity and the Alzheimer's Society. Sir Cliff Richard was the star performer, but among the performers and celebrity guests were old friends and colleagues, including June Whitfield, Rita Tushingham, and Joanna Lumley. Bryan managed to attend.

Death
Bryan died on 23 July 2014 at the age of 91. Her funeral service was held on 6 August 2014 at St George's Church, Brighton, where she had regularly attended services.

Selected filmography

 Odd Man Out (1947) - Girl in Telephone Kiosk (uncredited)
 The Fallen Idol (1948) - Rose
 No Room at the Inn (1948) - Spiv's Girlfriend (uncredited)
 Once Upon a Dream (1949) - Barmaid
 Now Barabbas (1949) - Winnie
 Adam and Evelyne (1949) - Blonde Sales Assistant (uncredited)
 Don't Ever Leave Me (1949) - Beautician (uncredited)
 The Interrupted Journey (1949) - Waitress
 The Cure for Love (1949) - Jenny Jenkins
 The Blue Lamp (1950) - Maisie
 No Trace (1950) - Maisie Phelps
 Traveller's Joy (1950) - Eva
 Something in the City (1950) - Waitress
 Files from Scotland Yard (1951) - Minnie Robinson
 The Quiet Woman (1951) - Elsie
 Circle of Danger (1951) - Bubbles Fitzgerald
 Scarlet Thread (1951) - Maggie
 No Highway in the Sky (1951) - Rosie, Barmaid (uncredited)
 Lady Godiva Rides Again (1951) - Lady in Charge of Publicity
 High Treason (1951) - Mrs. Bowers
 Whispering Smith Investigates (1952) - La Fosse
 Mother Riley Meets the Vampire (1952) - Tilly
 Time Gentlemen, Please! (1952) - Peggy Stebbins
 13 East Street (1952) - Valerie
 Gift Horse (1952) - Glad Flanagan
 Miss Robin Hood (1952) - Pearl
 Made in Heaven (1952) - Ethel Jenkins
 The Ringer (1952) - Mrs. Hackett
 Women of Twilight (1952) - Olga
 Street Corner (1953) - Prostitute at Police Station
 The Fake (1953) - Barmaid
 The Intruder (1953) - Dora Bee
 Fast and Loose (1954) - Mary Rawlings, the maid
 You Know What Sailors Are (1954) - Gladys
 The Young Lovers (1954) - Switchboard Operator (uncredited)
 The Crowded Day (1954) - Customer
 Mad About Men (1954) - Berengaria
 As Long as They're Happy (1955) - May
 See How They Run (1955) - Ida
 The Cockleshell Heroes (1955) - Myrtle
 You Lucky People! (1955) - Sgt. Hortense Tipp
 Child in the House (1956) - Cassie
 The Green Man (1956) - Lily
 Small Hotel (1957)
 British Pathé - Home on Wheels (1957) - Herself
 The Man Who Wouldn't Talk (1958) - Telephonist
 Carry On Sergeant (1958) - Norah
 Operation Bullshine (1959) - Pvt. Cox
 Desert Mice (1959) - Gay
 Follow That Horse! (1960) - Miss Bradstock
 The Night We Got the Bird (1961) - Julie Skidmore
 A Taste of Honey (1961) - Helen
 The Great St Trinian's Train Robbery (1966) - Amber Spottiswood
 The Sandwich Man (1966) - Mrs De Vere
 Two a Penny (1968) - Ruby Hopkins
 Hands of the Ripper (1971) - Mrs Golding
 Up the Front (1972) - Cora Crumpington
 Screamtime (1983) - Emma
 Apartment Zero (1988) - Margaret McKinney
 MirrorMask'' (2005) - Aunt Nan

Television roles

References

External links
 
 
 
 Dora Bryan exhibition at Grange Museum, Rottingdean

1923 births
2014 deaths
Actresses from Lancashire
Best British Actress BAFTA Award winners
British hoteliers
English film actresses
English stage actresses
English television actresses
English women singers
English Anglicans
Laurence Olivier Award winners
Officers of the Order of the British Empire
People from Southport
20th-century English actresses
21st-century English actresses
British comedy actresses
20th-century British businesspeople